Izi Dorot (1916–1980), born Isidore Roth, was an Israeli military official, and director of the Shabak between 1952 and 1953 and a Deputy Director of the Mossad between 1953 and 1963.

Born in Poland in 1916, Dorot immigrated to the British Mandate of Palestine in 1936, and served in the Jewish Settlement Police. In World War II he volunteered and served in the British Army. After his discharge he was recruited to the Haganah Intelligence Service. Subsequent to the 1948 Arab-Israeli War he was transferred to the Israel Security Agency (ISA, Shin Bet). After one year as Head of Shin Bet, in October 1953, Dorot followed Isser Harel to the Mossad as Deputy Director; he was replaced as Director of Shin Bet by Amos Manor. He served as deputy director of the Mossad until 1963.

References

1916 births
1980 deaths
Israeli Security Forces
Israeli civil servants
Directors of the Shin Bet
Polish emigrants to Mandatory Palestine